Oskee Wow-Wow (along with "Illinois Loyalty") is the official fight song of the University of Illinois at Urbana-Champaign. The song was written in 1910 by two students: Harold Vater Hill '11 (1889–1917), credited with the music, and Howard Ruggles Green '12 (1890–1969), credited with the lyrics.

History
"Oskee Wow-Wow" is an invented phrase similar to other college cheers and yells. The Illinois cheer was used from before the turn of the 20th century.

In the summer of 1910, Hill and Green composed and entered "Oskee Wow-Wow" and several other songs into a contest for a student-composed opera. The opera was never finished, so the two attempted to sell the musical numbers to a publisher. They managed to sell the song to Charley Graham, the manager of the U. of I. Supply Store (also known as the Co-Op) for $100. Hill and Green attempted to gift Graham "Hail to the Orange" by printing it on the back cover of "Oskee Wow-Wow," but Graham refused, citing the song's lack of "punch." "Oskee Wow Wow" was copyrighted in 1911. Melrose Bros. Music Co., Inc. of Chicago published it as sheet music in 1928  It became popular as the school's primary fight song primarily because "Illinois Loyalty," the older fight song, was not well suited to rousing large crowds at a game.

Lyrics

The original words of the song are as follows:

Media
The music is included in the ″Illini Fantasy″, a medley of Illinois songs and marches arranged for concert band by James Curnow in 1970 as a commission from Director of Bands Harry Begian.

There have long been two versions of the song.  Most commonly, it is played "from the hold" at the start of the chorus, when the "O" in "Oskee Wow-Wow" is held out.  This version is played after first downs and touchdowns in football and leading into time-outs in basketball.  Coincidentally, the buzzers at nearly every arena are in the same chord as the hold. The song was played "from the top" after an extra point was kicked but was replaced in favor of "Fight, Illini."  

For many years, the band started playing the song "from the top" toward the end of the warmup period in basketball. When conducted correctly, the "hold" was played just as the buzzer sounds. 

The song appears to have been written to be played after a touchdown, as it slows down while being played "from the top" before picking back up after the "hold."

See also
 List of University of Illinois songs
 Marching Illini
 Oski Yell

References

External links
 

American college songs
College fight songs in the United States
Big Ten Conference fight songs
University of Illinois Urbana-Champaign
1911 compositions